Paralaxita orphna is an Indomalayan butterfly species in the family Riodinidae. It was described by Jean Baptiste Boisduval in 1836.

Subspecies
P. o. orphna (Borneo, Pulau Laut, Palawan)
P. o. laocoon (de Nicéville, 1894) (Burma to Peninsular Malaya)
P. o. panyasis (Fruhstorfer, 1914) (Sumatra, Bangka)

References

Riodinidae
Butterflies of Indochina
Butterflies described in 1836